This portion of National Register of Historic Places listings in Puerto Rico is along the north coast, north plains, and north slopes of the Cordillera, from Isabela to Guaynabo.

Names of places given are as appear in the National Register, reflecting name as given in NRHP application at the date of listing. Note, the National Register name system does not accommodate Spanish á, ñ and other letters.

Arecibo 

|}

Barceloneta 

|}

Bayamón 

|}

Camuy 

|}

Cataño 

|}

Dorado 

|}

Florida 

|}

Guaynabo 

|}

Hatillo 

|}

Isabela 

|}

Manatí 

|}

Quebradillas 

|}

San Sebastián 

|}

Toa Alta 

|}

Toa Baja 

|}

Vega Alta 

|}

Vega Baja 

|}

See also

National Register of Historic Places listings in Puerto Rico
National Register of Historic Places listings in southern Puerto Rico
National Register of Historic Places listings in western Puerto Rico
National Register of Historic Places listings in eastern Puerto Rico
National Register of Historic Places listings in central Puerto Rico
National Register of Historic Places listings in metropolitan San Juan, Puerto Rico
List of United States National Historic Landmarks in United States commonwealths and territories, associated states, and foreign states
Historic preservation
History of Puerto Rico

Notes

References

External links
Puerto Rico State Historic Preservation Office, National Register of Historic Places site 
National Park Service, National Register of Historic Places site

Northern